Link Community Development International (Link) is an international NGO working to improve the quality of education in Africa. Since 1992 the organization has positively impacted the lives of 1.7 million children in over 3,000 schools in Ghana, Ethiopia, Malawi, Uganda, and South Africa. Link works at all levels of the education system to unlock local solutions to school improvement.

In partnership with Ministries of Education, District Departments of Education, schools, and communities they work with all schools in target districts providing a variety of capacity building training, resources and support to schools, teachers, headteachers and district education staff. This includes specific literacy, numeracy, and HIV/AIDS projects. Link's vision is a world where all children have access to quality education.

Link has created a School Performance Review process that supports school districts to collect and analyse school performance data, then share this information with schools and communities to enable a grassroots, collaborative school improvement planning process.

History 

Link was founded in 1989 as Link Africa by students of Cambridge University who actively supported Black Education in South Africa. Due to the educational departments restructuring after the end of apartheid in 1994, Link shifted its focus from placement work to government; aiming to support the new integrated Department of Education. During this time Link Africa became Link Community Development. Link continues to expand and is now a leading specialist NGO in whole district school interventions. The Most Revd Desmond Tutu is the Patron of Link.

Vision 
Link’s vision is a world where every child has the right to quality education.

Mission 

Link's mission is to inspire sustainable innovations in national education policy using grassroots approaches to improve accountability and learner outcomes.

Morocco/Croatia Hitch

The Morocco/Croatia Hitch was Link’s biggest fundraiser and the world's largest organised hitchhiking event. It occurred every Easter holiday with students from universities across the UK taking part. It began in 1992, with Prague being added in 2003. This second destination was changed to Croatia for the 2012 event. More than 8,500 people have taken part in the Hitch since it started, raising at least £4.5million. The final Hitch took place in 2016.

References

Educational organisations based in Ethiopia
Educational organisations based in Malawi
Educational organisations based in Uganda